A Muslim Childhood (Moroccan Arabic title: El Ayel, French title: Le gosse de Tanger) is a 2005 Moroccan film directed by Moumen Smihi. It was screened at the Marrakesh International Film Festival.

Synopsis 
Part of a loose autobiographical trilogy, the film, shot in Smihi's hometown of Tangier, is a reminiscence of the past. It chronicles the childhood of Larbi Salmi, a reckless and confused 10 year old.

Cast 

 Abdesslam Begdouri as Mohamed Larbi Salmi
 Saïd Amel as Sidi Ahmed Salmi
 Bahija El Hachami as Lalla Alia
 Khouloud as Aouicha
 Rim Taoud as Khadija
 Nadia Alami as Chems Doha
 Issam Fiyache as Khalil
 Salma El Aouni as the grandmother
 Abdel Majid Haddad as the schoolteacher

References

External links 
 

2005 films
Moroccan drama films